Ioan Miclescu-Prăjescu (17 June 1892 – 1973) was a Romanian fencer. He competed in the individual épée event at the 1936 Summer Olympics.

References

1892 births
1973 deaths
Romanian male fencers
Olympic fencers of Romania
Fencers at the 1936 Summer Olympics